Crossing the ditch can refer to:
Crossing the Ditch a successful 1977 attempt to cross the Tasman Sea by canoe
"Crossing the ditch", colloquially, refers to Trans-Tasman travel and migration between Australia and New Zealand

Australia–New Zealand relations
Australia–New Zealand border